Grand Cape Mount-1 is an electoral district for the elections to the House of Representatives of Liberia. The constituency covers Gola Konneh District (except Jenne Brown community) and Porkpa District (except Dazanbo community).

Elected representatives

References

Electoral districts in Liberia